Hegde is a village in Kumta on the western coast of India in the Uttara Kannada district of the state of Karnataka. Hegde is also the native of Mr. Ranjan Baleri who is an entrepreneur and philanthropist based in Bangalore.

Location
Hegde is 4 km away from National Highway 17, which runs from Mumbai to Thiruvananthapuram. 
Distances to some of the major cities are: 
 Bangalore 470 km
 Dharwad 177 km
 Goa (Panaji) 179 km
 Mangalore 204 km
 Mumbai 738 km
 Pune 598 km
 Bhatkal 60 km
 Honnavar 25 km

On the Konkan Railway line, the nearest railway station is Kumta. Autorickshaws, buses and other modes of road transport are available to reach Hegde from the railway station. The nearest international airports are Goa (180 km) Mangalore (207 km).

Climate
This part of Karnataka has very hot Summer with temperature rising of maximum of 35-36 degree Celsius and the Rainfall here is seasonal, but heavy and is above 6000 mm. in a year. The impact of winter is less in this part of Coastal Karnataka. Since the city is located on the coast, it has an extreme climate, with temperatures in the range of 360C to 280C during summer and 260C to 200C during winter. The rainy season witnesses heavy rains by the South-West Monsoon.

The Monsoon period is from June to September with rainfall averaging more than 4000mm every year and heavy winds.

Education
 MHPS Hegde,
 KGS Hegde,
 HPS Melinakeri
 HPS Masur
 Dr. A.V. Baliga College Of Arts & Science
 Kamala Baliga College Of Education 
 Vidyadhiraj Polytechnic

Religion
The main temple and deity is devi Shri Shantika Parameshwari. Hegde car festival is one of the major car fest in Karavali.

See also 
 Gokarna
 Kumta

References

 
 Kumta Beach
 
 

Villages in Uttara Kannada district